Bogoraz is a surname of Russian-Jewish origin which is an acronym of "Ben ha-rav Zalman" (בן הרב זאַלמאַן) (son of rabbi Zalman), with /h/ becoming /g/ in Russian spelling and, subsequently, pronunciation. It may refer to: 

Vladimir Bogoraz (1865–1936), Russian anthropologist
Larisa Bogoraz (1929–2004), Soviet dissident 
 (1874–1952), Russian and Soviet surgeon , urologist, professor , honored worker of science of the RSFSR,

See also
Bogorad, a surname of similar etymology

References 

Russian-Jewish surnames
Yiddish-language surnames